The 2008 Georgia Bulldogs football team competed in American football on behalf of the University of Georgia in 2008. The Bulldogs competed in the East Division of the Southeastern Conference (SEC). This was the Georgia Bulldogs' eighth season under the guidance of head coach Mark Richt. During the pre-game ceremonies on August 30, UGA VII was introduced at Sanford Stadium, replacing UGA VI, who died in June.

Georgia was ranked #1 in both the preseason coaches poll and AP poll, marking the first time Georgia has ever been #1 in the preseason version of either poll. However, they finished the season ranked below the top 10 in the AP poll.

Georgia entered the 2008 season with the longest active winning streak among the 66 BCS conference teams having won their last 7 games of the 2007 season. Among the 120 NCAA FBS teams, only BYU had a longer active winning streak (10 games). Georgia's winning streak ended at 11 games with its loss to Alabama in the 5th game of the 2008 season.

Rankings

Schedule

Game summaries

Georgia Southern

Georgia won its season opener over Georgia Southern, 45–21. Georgia led 38–0 in the 3rd quarter before replacing many of its starting players. Knowshon Moreno scored 3 touchdowns on eight rushing attempts. Georgia lost its #1 ranking after the game and would never regain it, losing it after this game in part to USC's 52–7 win over Virginia and the perception that Georgia's defense was questionable for allowing three touchdowns to a lesser opponent.

A. J. Green recorded his first career touchdown on a 3-yard pass from back-up quarterback, Joe Cox.

Central Michigan

Georgia coasted to a second straight victory to start the season, beating Central Michigan, 56–17. Knowshon Moreno had 3 touchdowns and 168 yards on 18 carries. Moreno had a 52-yard touchdown run and added a highlight reel leap over Central Michigan defender Vince Agnew on a 29-yard run.  Matthew Stafford added two touchdown passes, including a 54-yard bomb to Mohammed Massaquoi. Demarcus Dobbs picked off a Central Michigan pass late in the second quarter and ran 79 yards for a defensive touchdown.

South Carolina

Georgia beat the South Carolina Gamecocks in a low-scoring game that was closer than many expected, finally prevailing 14–7. The young offensive line struggled with the South Carolina defense. Matthew Stafford completed 15 of 25 passes for 146 yards, but his biggest play came on a 30-yard 3rd quarter run to the South Carolina 4, setting up a Knowshon Moreno touchdown run on the next play. Moreno had 79 yards on 20 carries. A. J. Green led the Georgia receivers with 3 catches for 61 yards.

Arizona State

Georgia scored three 2nd-quarter touchdowns to take a 21–3 lead at halftime against Arizona State. The 2nd half was rather uneventful, and Georgia rolled to an easy 27–10 win. Stafford had the most passing yards of his career (285), and A. J. Green had a breakout game with 159 yards on 8 catches. Moreno also added 2 touchdowns and 149 yards rushing on 23 carries. A. J. Green was named SEC Freshman of the Week for his performance.

Alabama

ESPN's College Gameday broadcast their show live from Athens before the Alabama game. The visit was the show's first broadcast from Athens since the Tennessee game in 1998.  A. J. Green led all Georgia receivers with 6 catches for 88 yards and a touchdown.  This game was notable in that it was only the third ever "blackout" game where the team donned black jerseys and the majority of the fans wore black. However, unlike earlier two contests which were both big Georgia wins, the Crimson Tide dominated early in the game and built an insurmountable 31-0 halftime lead from which Georgia was unable to recover.  After the disappointment of this game, the bulldogs would never have another blackout game until 2016 where they faced against Louisiana-Lafayette.

Tennessee

Georgia ended a 2-game losing streak to Tennessee with a 26–14 win in Athens. Stafford had 310 yards passing in his first career 300-yard passing game. A 28-yard field goal by Blair Walsh capped off a 17 play, fourth quarter drive that ran 10 minutes and 55 seconds off the clock. The drive was the longest by an SEC team since LSU had an 11-minute, 2 second drive against Arizona State in 2005.

Vanderbilt

Georgia beat the #23-ranked Vanderbilt Commodores, 24-14, on homecoming weekend.  Knowshon Moreno had a season high 172 yards and 1 touchdown on 23 carries, and A. J. Green had 7 catches for 132 yards and 1 touchdown.

LSU

Source: 
    
    
    
    
    
    
    
    
    
    
    
    
    

Georgia beat the #11-ranked LSU Tigers, 52–38, in Tiger Stadium.  Stafford was 17 of 26 passing for 249 yards and 2 touchdowns.  He also added 1 rushing touchdown.  Knowshon Moreno rushed 21 times for 163 yards and 1 touchdown on a 68-yard 3rd quarter run.  Linebacker Darryl Gamble, starting at middle linebacker position for the injured Dannell Ellerbe, twice intercepted LSU quarterback, Jarrett Lee, for touchdown returns of 40 and 53 yards. A. J. Green had 3 receptions for 89 yards, including a 49-yard 3rd-quarter touchdown.

Florida

Florida routed Georgia, 49–10, in one of the most heavily hyped Florida–Georgia football rivalry games ever.  Stafford struggled, going 18 of 33 for 265 yards passing with 0 touchdowns and 3 interceptions.  The loss was the largest margin of defeat in Mark Richt's 8-year head coaching career.

Kentucky

Georgia beat Kentucky, 42-38, after Matthew Stafford threw an 11-yard touchdown pass to A. J. Green with 1:54 left in the 4th quarter.  Demarcus Dobbs then intercepted a last minute pass from Kentucky quarterback Randall Cobb to preserve the win for Georgia.  Stafford had a career-high 376 yards passing and 3 touchdowns.  Mohammed Massaquoi also had a career-high 191 receiving yards with 8 receptions and 1 touchdown.

Auburn

Matthew Stafford threw a 17-yard, 4th-quarter touchdown pass to A. J. Green, and the Bulldogs stopped a late Auburn drive to win 17–13.  The win marked Georgia's 3rd straight win against Auburn for the first time since winning 3 straight against Auburn from 1980 to 1982.

Georgia Tech

A disappointing regular season for Georgia ended with an upset loss to bitter rival Georgia Tech, snapping Georgia's 7-game winning streak in the series. Georgia had a 28–12 halftime lead but Georgia Tech outscored Georgia 23–0 in the third quarter. Matthew Stafford led the Dawgs with a career-high of 407 yds passing and 5 tds. 3 of those went to Mohamed Massaquoi.

Capital One Bowl

The final game of the season would prove to be the Capital One Bowl in Orlando, Florida against Michigan State. It would be Matthew Stafford's and Knowshon Moreno's last game at UGA. Stafford threw three touchdown passes in the 2nd half of game. The final touchdown of the game was caught by Knowshon Moreno cementing the win for Georgia in this bowl game.

Statistics

Team

Scores by quarter

Offense

Rushing

Passing

Receiving

Defense

Special teams

Players
Head Coach Mark Richt dismissed two players on October 8, 2008. Donavan Baldwin, a safety, and Walter Hill, a wide receiver were removed from the team.

References

Georgia
Georgia Bulldogs football seasons
Citrus Bowl champion seasons
Georgia Bulldogs football